Jan Franssen (born 11 June 1951 in Hilversum) is a Dutch politician.

Franssen is a member of the VVD.  He began his political career as an advisor to Hans Wiegel, having previously worked as a history teacher.  Franssen was also a city councillor of Nederhorst den Berg, leader of the provincial parliament of North Holland and a member of the House of Representatives (1982–1994). From 1994 to 2000 Franssen was mayor of Zwolle.  Finally. he was named King's Commissioner in South Holland in 2000. He resigned on December 31, 2013. He was made member of the Council of State of the Netherlands the next day.

He is the current chairman of the Interprovinciaal Overleg (IPO), that looks after provincial interests.

Franssen is openly gay.

Jan Franssen is one of three openly gay politicians who served as King's Commissioner, the other two are: Clemens Cornielje, and Arno Brok.

See also
List of openly LGBT heads of government
List of the first LGBT holders of political offices
List of LGBT holders of political offices in the Netherlands

External links
 Profile at Parlement.com

References

1951 births
Living people
Converts to Roman Catholicism from Calvinism
Dutch educators
Dutch Roman Catholics
Gay politicians
King's and Queen's Commissioners of South Holland
LGBT conservatism
LGBT mayors of places in the Netherlands
LGBT members of the Parliament of the Netherlands
LGBT King's and Queen's Commissioners of the Netherlands
LGBT Roman Catholics
Mayors of Zwolle
Members of the Council of State (Netherlands)
Members of the House of Representatives (Netherlands)
Members of the Provincial Council of North Holland
Municipal councillors in North Holland
People from Hilversum
People's Party for Freedom and Democracy politicians
Knights of the Holy Sepulchre